Trevor John Barnes, FBA (born 14 July 1956, London, England) is a British geographer and Professor of Economic geography at the University of British Columbia.

Background
Trevor Barnes received his Ph.D. in 1983 at University of Minnesota with a thesis under the supervision of Eric Sheppard titled The Geography of Value, Production, and Distribution: Theoretical Economic Geography after Sraffa. Barnes began his career as a spatial scientist, but in recent years his interest has moved to the history of economic geography. His current projects concern the history of geography's quantitative revolution; epistemological pluralism in economic geography; the institutional analysis of forestry with Roger Hayter; and creative industries. His co-edited volume, Writing Worlds helped initiate geography's turn towards questions of discourse; it has been widely cited by researchers studying the geography of media and communication. In 2014 he was elected a Corresponding Fellow of the British Academy.

Recognition 

In 2019, Barnes was awarded the Royal Geographical Society's Founder’s Medal for his "sustained excellence and pioneering developments in the field of economic geography".

Barnes is considered by notable geographers as a "Key Thinker on Space and Place" and in 2011 was made a Fellow of the Royal Society of Canada. In 2012, he was given the Ellen Churchill Semple award at the Department of Geography, University of Kentucky.

Publications
 Sheppard, E., and Barnes, T.J. The Capitalist Space Economy: Geographical Analysis After Ricardo, Marx and Sraffa. London: Unwin Hyman, 1990.
 Barnes, T.J., and Duncan, J.S. (eds.) Writing Worlds: Texts, Discourses and Metaphors in the Interpretation of Landscape. London: Routledge, 1992.
 Barnes, T. J. Logics of Dislocation: Models, Metaphors, and Meanings of Economic Space. New York: The Guilford Press, 1995. 
 Barnes, T.J., Gregory, D. (eds.) Reading Human Geography: The Poetics and Politics of Inquiry. New York: Wiley, 1997.
 Barnes, T. J. and Hayter, R. (eds.) Troubles in the Rainforest: British Columbia's Forest Economy in Transition. Victoria: Western Geographical Press, 1997. 
 Barnes, T. J. and Gertler, M. S. (eds.) The New Industrial Geography: Regions, Regulation and Institutions. London: Routledge, 1999.
 Sheppard, E. and Barnes, T. J. (eds.) A Companion to Economic Geography. Oxford: Blackwell, 2000.
 Barnes, T. J., Peck, J., Sheppard, E., and Tickell, A. (eds.) Reading Economic Geography. Oxford: Blackwell, 2003.
 Tickell, A., Sheppard, E., Peck, J., and Barnes, T. J. (eds.) Politics and Practice in Economic Geography. London:Sage, 2007.
 Barnes, T. J., Peck, J., and Sheppard, E. (eds.) The Wiley-Blackwell Companion to Economic Geography. Chichester: Wiley-Blackwell, 2012.

Further reading
Susanne Reimer. Trevor Barnes. In: Phil Hubbard, Rob Kitchin, Gill Valentine (editors). Key Thinkers on Space and Place. SAGE Publications, 2004, p. 22-26.

References

External links
 Trevor Barnes page at the University of British Columbia.

1956 births
Living people
Alumni of University College London
University of Minnesota alumni
Canadian geographers
British geographers
Fellows of the Royal Society of Canada
Academic staff of the University of British Columbia
Academics from London
Economic geographers
Corresponding Fellows of the British Academy
Recipients of the Royal Geographical Society Founder's Medal